American singer and songwriter Haley Reinhart has been featured in seventeen music videos and eight television series or specials. Reinhart garnered widespread attention for her Jazz fusion and Rock styles when she appeared on the tenth season of American Idol.

Reinhart and fellow Idol contestant Casey Abrams released a promotional cover of the Christmas standard "Baby, It's Cold Outside" in late 2011, after attaining positive reception for the jazz duets sung by the pair on Idol. In 2012, Reinhart released her debut studio album Listen Up!, with the release of the music video for the single "Free". In 2014, she released the music video for the single "Show Me Your Moves" that was made possible with the help of an Indiegogo crowd funding campaign. In 2015, she released a promotional music video for the song "Can't Help Falling In Love" for her second studio album, which was featured in the Extra gum commercial "The Story of Sarah and Juan" and received viral recognition. In 2016, Reinhart released her second studio album, Better, along with the release of the music video for the lead single "Better". In 2017, Reinhart released music videos for her songs "Baby It's You" and "The Letter" as promotion for her third studio album, What's That Sound. In August 2017, Reinhart released a lyric video to support the release of the album's third single, "For What It's Worth".

Reinhart has appeared in various television series since her debut on American Idol, which includes being a musical guest on the show in later seasons. She is currently the voice of Bill Murphy in the animated Netflix series, F Is for Family.

Music videos

Film

Television

References

External links
Haley Reinhart's official Vevo channel on YouTube
[ Discography and videography of Haley Reinhart] at Allmusic

Actress filmographies
Videographies of American artists
American filmographies